Simone de Beauvoir's Babies is a 1997 Australian television mini-series broadcast by the Australian Broadcasting Corporation in 1997.

The series comprises four one-hour episodes starring Sally Cooper, Anne Looby, Leverne McDonnell and Sonia Todd as women in their late 30s who are single, childless and aware of their biological clocks ticking down.

David Wenham won the 1997 Australian Film Institute Award for Best Lead Actor in Television Drama for his role as Ian.

The soundtrack for the series was composed by Jen Anderson.

References

External links 

1997 Australian television series debuts
1990s Australian drama television series
Australian Broadcasting Corporation original programming
English-language television shows